Vasaras is a village in Laconia, Greece. It is part of the municipality Sparti, municipal unit Oinountas.

Populated places in Laconia